Fencing was contested at the 2017 Summer Universiade from August 20 to 25 at the National Taipei Nangang Exhibition Center in Taipei, Taiwan.

Participating nations
447 fencers from 54 nations participated at the 2017 Summer Universiade.

Medal summary

Medal table

Men's events

Women's events

References

External links
Summer Universiade – Fencing
Result book – Fencing 

 
2017 in fencing
2017 Summer Universiade events
Fencing at the Summer Universiade